The Boeing 737 MAX airliner, which began service in 2017, was involved in two fatal accidents, Lion Air Flight 610 on October 29, 2018, and Ethiopian Airlines Flight 302 on March 10, 2019, that resulted from a malfunction of the aircraft's new flight stabilizing software, the Maneuvering Characteristics Augmentation System (MCAS).

After the Ethiopian Airlines crash, China and most other civil aviation authorities grounded the airliner over perceived safety risks. Boeing CEO Dennis Muilenburg assured President Donald Trump  the airplane was safe, in response to Trump's social media comments. Having new evidence of accident similarities, the U.S. Federal Aviation Administration (FAA) grounded the aircraft on March 13, 2019, reversing a Continued Airworthiness Notice issued two days prior. About 30 MAX aircraft were flying in U.S. airspace at the time and were allowed to reach their destinations. By March 18, regulators grounded all 387 MAX aircraft in service with 59 airlines worldwide and making 8,600 flights each week. Several ferry flights were operated with flaps extended to circumvent MCAS activation.

The grounding subsequently became the longest ever of a U.S. airliner. As of January 2020, another 400 newly manufactured aircraft await delivery to airlines pending the aircraft's return to service.

Regulators 

March 11
 China: The Civil Aviation Administration of China ordered all domestic airlines to suspend operations of all 737 MAX 8 aircraft by 18:00 local time (10:00 GMT), pending the results of the investigation, thus grounding all 96 Boeing 737 MAX planes (c. 25% of all delivered) in China.
 United States: The FAA issued an affirmation of the continued airworthiness of the 737 MAX. The FAA stated that it had no evidence from the crashes to justify regulatory action against the aircraft.
 Indonesia: Nine hours after China's grounding, the Indonesian Ministry of Transportation issued a temporary suspension on the operation of all eleven 737 MAX 8 aircraft in Indonesia. A nationwide inspection on the type was expected to take place on March 12 to "ensure that aircraft operating in Indonesia are in an airworthy condition".
 Mongolia: Civil Aviation Authority of Mongolia (MCAA) said in a statement "MCAA has temporarily stopped the 737 MAX flight operated by MIAT Mongolian Airlines from March 11, 2019."
March 12
 Singapore: the Civil Aviation Authority of Singapore, "temporarily suspends" operation of all variants of the 737 MAX aircraft into and out of Singapore.
 India: Directorate General of Civil Aviation (DGCA) released a statement "DGCA has taken the decision to ground the 737 MAX aircraft immediately, pursuant to new inspections.
 Turkey: Directorate General of Civil Aviation suspended flights of 737 MAX 8 and 9 type aircraft being operated by Turkish companies in Turkey, and stated that they are also reviewing the possibility of closing the country's airspace for the same.
 South Korea: Ministry of Land, Infrastructure and Transport (MOLIT) advised Eastar Jet, the only airline of South Korea to possess Boeing 737 MAX aircraft to ground their models, and three days later issued a NOTAM (Notice to Airmen) message to block all Boeing 737 MAX models from landing and departing from all domestic airports.
 European Union: The European Union Aviation Safety Agency (EASA) suspended all flight operations of all 737-8 MAX and 737-9 MAX in the European Union. In addition, EASA published a Safety Directive, published at 18:23, effective as of 19:00 UTC, suspending all commercial flights performed by third-country operators into, within or out of the EU of the above mentioned models The reasons invoked include: "Technical decision, data driven, precautionary measure: Similarities with the Lion Air accident data; Application of EASA guidance material for taking corrective actions in case of potential unsafe conditions; Additional considerations: no direct access to the investigation, unusual scenario of a 'young' aircraft experiencing 2 fatal accidents in less than 6 months".
 Canada: Minister of Transport Marc Garneau said it was premature to consider groundings and that, "If I had to fly somewhere on that type of aircraft today, I would."
 Australia: The Civil Aviation Safety Authority banned Boeing 737 MAX from Australian airspace.
 Malaysia: The Civil Aviation Authority of Malaysia suspended the operations of the Boeing 737 MAX 8 aircraft flying to or from Malaysia and transiting in Malaysia.
March 13
 Canada: Minister of Transport Marc Garneau, prompted by receipt of new information, said "There can't be any MAX 8 or MAX 9 flying into, out of or across Canada", effectively grounding all 737 MAX aircraft in Canadian airspace.
 United States: President Donald Trump announced on March 13, that United States authorities would ground all 737 MAX 8 and MAX 9 aircraft in the United States. After the President's announcement, the FAA officially ordered the grounding of all 737 MAX 8 and 9 operated by U.S. airlines or in the United States airspace. The FAA did allow airlines to make ferry flights without passengers or flight attendants in order to reposition the aircraft in central locations.
 Hong Kong: The Civil Aviation Department banned the operation of all 737 Max aircraft into, out of and over Hong Kong.
 Panama: The Civil Aviation Authority grounded its aircraft.
 Vietnam: The Civil Aviation Authority of Vietnam banned Boeing 737 MAX aircraft from flying over Vietnam.
 New Zealand: The Civil Aviation Authority of New Zealand suspended Boeing 737 MAX aircraft from its airspace.
 Mexico: Mexico's civil aviation authority suspended flights by Boeing 737 MAX 8 and MAX 9 aircraft in and out of the country.
 Brazil: The National Civil Aviation Agency (ANAC) suspended the 737 MAX 8 aircraft from flying.
 Colombia: Colombia's civil aviation authority banned Boeing 737 MAX 8 planes from flying over its airspace.
 Chile: The Directorate General of Civil Aviation banned Boeing 737 MAX 8 flights in the country's airspace.
 Trinidad and Tobago: The Director General of Civil Aviation banned Boeing 737 Max 8 and 9 planes from use in civil aviation operations within and over Trinidad and Tobago.
March 14
 Taiwan: The Civil Aeronautics Administration banned Boeing 737 MAX from entering, leaving or flying over Taiwan.
 Japan: Japan's transport ministry banned flights by Boeing 737 MAX 8 and 9 aircraft from its airspace.
March 16
 Argentina: The National Civil Aviation Administration (ANAC) closed airspace to Boeing 737 MAX flights.
June 27
 Belgium issued a NOTAM extending the 737 MAX 8 and MAX 9 ban until 2020.

Airlines 

After the Ethiopian Airlines crash, some airlines proactively grounded their fleets and regulatory bodies grounded the others. (This list includes 6 more 737 MAX aircraft than the official FAA record; these aircraft may have powered on their transponders, but not delivered to an airline. Some pre-delivered aircraft are located at Boeing Field, Renton Municipal Airport and Paine Field airports).

Effect on MAX flights 
At the time of its grounding, the MAX was operating 8,600 flights per week.

About thirty Boeing 737 MAX aircraft were airborne in U.S. airspace when the FAA grounding order was announced. The airplanes were allowed to continue to their destinations and were then grounded. In Europe, several flights were diverted when grounding orders were issued. For example, an Israel-bound Norwegian 737 MAX aircraft returned to Stockholm, and two Turkish Airlines MAX aircraft flying to Britain, one to Gatwick Airport south of London and the other to Birmingham, turned around and flew back to Turkey.

On June 11, 2019, Norwegian Flight DY8922 attempted a ferry flight from Málaga, Spain to Stockholm, Sweden. However, the aircraft was refused entry into German airspace, and diverted to Châlons Vatry, France.

In a rare exemption, Transport Canada approved eleven flights in August and September 2019, partly to maintain the qualifications of senior Air Canada training pilots, because the airline has no earlier-generation 737s within its fleet. The airline used the MAX during planned maintenance movements, and ultimately flew it to Pinal Airpark in Arizona for storage.

In early October 2019, Icelandair moved two of its five MAX 8s for winter storage in the milder climate of northern Spain, making the entire flight with flaps extended to prevent MCAS activation.

References 

2019 in aviation
Boeing